The 1991–92 Bulgarian Cup was the 52nd season of the Bulgarian Cup. Levski Sofia won the competition, beating Pirin Blagoevgrad 5–0 in the final at the Georgi Benkovski Stadium in Pazardzhik.

First round

|-
!colspan=5 style="background-color:#D0F0C0;" |13 / 27 November 1991

|-
|}

Second round

|-
!colspan=5 style="background-color:#D0F0C0;" |7 / 14 December 1991

|}

Quarter-finals

|-
!colspan=5 style="background-color:#D0F0C0;" |4 / 18 March 1992

|}

Semi-finals

|-
!colspan=5 style="background-color:#D0F0C0;" |1 / 15 April 1992

|}

Final

Details

References

1991-92
1991–92 domestic association football cups
Cup